Tamba Songu M'briwa (born 1910-1968) was a prominent Sierra Leonean politician and paramount chief from the Kono ethnic group, who formed one of the few political parties in Sierra Leone before independence.

Early life and political career
Tamba Songu M'briwa was born in 1910 in the village of Jagbwema, Fiama Chiefdom, Kono District, in the Eastern Province  of British Sierra Leone to parents from the Kono ethnic group. He was educated at a local primary school in Kono District before proceeding to the Bo Government Secondary School in Bo. He worked as a government dispenser before he became paramount chief. As a paramount chief in the colonial era, Tamba Songu M'briwa did much to improve the life of his people. He established schools in his chiefdom and was generally devoted to the education of young people in Kono District.

As a politician, he formed the Sierra Leone People's Independence Movement (SLPIM.) later renamed it as the Kono People's Union (KPU.) As leader of his party he tried to inculcate a sense of responsibility in his followers, and did his best to educate the Kono people on their political rights. His party became so popular and famous in the Kono District that even the Sierra Leone People's Party (SLPP), the biggest and most dominant political party in the country never won a single seat in local government elections in the Kono District during the existence of the KPU party.

He was a fearless leader who was highly respected for his selflessness, which won him the admiration of many positive-thinking Sierra Leoneans. Convinced of the need for unity, he did much in the way of bringing together the various and ethnic groups in into his political party.

When Sir Milton Margai, the leader of the Sierra Leone People's Party (SLPP) took  power in 1961 as Sierra Leone's first prime minister Tamba Songu M'briwa was a prominent member of his government. He remained a popular politician and a prominent paramount chief until he fell out with Sir Milton Margai. He was subsequently removed from office and banished to Kamakwie, Bombali District in the  Northern Province of the country. He later joined forces with the All People's Congress (APC) party  in assisting in the victory of the APC over the SLPP in the 1967 general elections. He died in 1968, a few days after winning the by-elections as Paramount Chief of Kono District in the Sierra Leone Parliament.

External links
https://web.archive.org/web/20080720052535/http://www.sierra-leone.org/heroes9.html

1910 births
1968 deaths
Members of the Parliament of Sierra Leone
All People's Congress politicians
People from Kono District